The Assyrian calendar is a solar calendar used by modern Assyrian people.

History

The modern Assyrian calendar, however, uses a different reckoning: 4750 BC was set as its first year in the 1950s, based on a series of articles published in the Assyrian nationalist magazine Gilgamesh; the first came in 1952 and written by Nimrod Simono and dealt with the Akitu festival, then an article by Jean Alkhas in 1955 (April, issue 34) fixed the year 4750 BC as the starting point. Alkhas referenced his information to a French archaeologist, whom he did not name, as stating that a cuneiform tablet dating to 4750 BC mentioned the year of the calming of the great flood and beginning of life.

New year
The year begins with the first sight of Spring. In the Julian calendar, the vernal equinox moved gradually away from 21 March. The Gregorian calendar reform restored the vernal equinox to its original date, but since the festival was by now tied to the date, not the astronomical event, Kha b-Nisan remains fixed at 21 March in the Julian reckoning, corresponding to 1 April in the Gregorian calendar. and the calendar adopted by the ancient Assyrians had the month "Nisan" at the beginning of the calendar lending to the term "Kha b-Nisan", or the "first of Nisan".

Months

See also 
 Babylonian calendar
 Hebrew calendar
 Islamic calendar
 Kha b-Nisan
 Mandaean calendar
 Persian calendar
 Solar Hijri calendar
 Zoroastrian calendar

References

Specific calendars